The San Angelo metropolitan statistical area (MSA) is a metropolitan area in West Texas that covers two counties - Tom Green and Irion. As of the 2010 census, the MSA had a population of 111,823, with a 2014 estimate of 118,182.

Counties
Irion
Tom Green

Communities

Cities
San Angelo (principal city)
Mertzon

Census-designated places
Christoval
Grape Creek

Unincorporated places
Barnhart 
Carlsbad
Knickerbocker
Sherwood 
Tankersley
Vancourt
Veribest
Wall
Water Valley

Demographics
As of the census of 2020, 122,888 people, 47,794 households, and 28,198 families were residing within the MSA. The racial makeup of the MSA was 65.8% White (non-Hispanic White 52.4%), 3.7% African American, 0.9% Native American, 1.5% Asian, and 17.6% from other races. Hispanics or Latinos of any race were 38.9% of the population.

See also
List of cities in Texas
 List of museums in West Texas 
Texas census statistical areas
List of Texas metropolitan areas

References

 
Geography of Tom Green County, Texas
Geography of Irion County, Texas